Libor Došek (born 24 April 1978 in Brno) is a Czech former professional footballer. His position was striker. He was called up for the Czech Republic for the 2000 Olympics. He was known for a strong height advantage and good aerial ability.

External links
 Club Profile  
 
 

Living people
1978 births
Footballers from Brno
Association football forwards
Czech footballers
Czech Republic under-21 international footballers
Olympic footballers of the Czech Republic
Footballers at the 2000 Summer Olympics
Czech expatriate footballers
Czech First League players
Super League Greece players
FC Zbrojovka Brno players
1. FC Slovácko players
FK Chmel Blšany players
FC Slovan Liberec players
AC Sparta Prague players
FK Teplice players
Xanthi F.C. players
Expatriate footballers in Greece